The following is a list of current, former, and confirmed future facilities of Ford Motor Company for manufacturing automobiles and other components.  Per regulations, the factory is encoded into each vehicle's VIN as character 11 for North American models, and character 8 for European models.
 
The River Rouge Complex manufactured most of the components of Ford vehicles, starting with the Model T. Much of the production was devoted to compiling "knock-down kits" that were then shipped in wooden crates to Branch Assembly locations across the United States by railroad and assembled locally, using local supplies as necessary. A few of the original Branch Assembly locations still remain while most have been repurposed or have been demolished and the land reused. Knock-down kits were also shipped internationally until the River Rouge approach was duplicated in Europe and Asia.

For a listing of Ford's proving grounds and test facilities see Ford Proving Grounds.

Current production facilities

Future production facilities

Former production facilities

Former branch assembly plants

See also 
 List of Mazda facilities
 List of Chrysler factories
 List of GM factories

References

Sources
 Descriptions of Ford's worldwide facilities

 
Ford